Azure-Té is the third studio album by American jazz singer Karrin Allyson. The album was recorded in the Soundtrek Studios of Kansas City, Missouri and was released on March 21, 1995 by Concord Jazz label.

Reception
Chuck Berg writing for JazzTimes commented, "Karrin Allyson's alluring Azure-Té is a gem. Here she takes the action back to her adopted home town with a cross-section of Kansas City's best and brightest." Scott Yanow of AllMusic noted that the album is "highly recommended."

Track listing

Personnel
Karrin Allyson – vocals, piano (tracks: 7)
Rod Fleeman – acoustic guitar (tracks: 2 4 7 9 11 12)
Kim Park – alto saxophone (tracks: 3 6), tenor saxophone (tracks: 3 8)
Bob Bowman – bass (tracks: 1 2 5 6 8 9)
Gerald Spaits – bass (tracks: 3 10 11)
Todd Strait – drums (tracks: 1 to 6, 8 to 11)
Danny Embrey – electric guitar (tracks: 1 3 4 10 12)
Mike Metheny – flugelhorn (tracks: 5)
Stan Kessler – flugelhorn (tracks: 3)
Randy Weinstein – harmonica (tracks: 9)
Laura Caviani – piano (tracks: 3 10 11)
Paul Smith – piano (tracks: 1 5 6 8)
Stan Kessler – trumpet (tracks: 3)
Claude Williams – violin (tracks: 2)
Bryan Hicks – vocals (tracks: 3)

References

1995 albums
Karrin Allyson albums